Sinsy (Singing Voice Synthesis System) (しぃんしぃ) is an online Hidden Markov model (HMM)-based singing voice synthesis system by the Nagoya Institute of Technology that was created under the Modified BSD license.

Overview
The online demonstrator is free to use, but will only generate tracks up to 5 minutes. The user uploads data in the MusicXML format, which the Sinsy website reads to output a WAV file of the generated voice. Gender factor, vibrato intensity, and pitch shift can be adjusted prior to output.

As of December 25, 2015, the official developers of Sinsy were Keiichi Tokuda (Producer and designer), Keiichiro Oura (Design and Development), Kazuhiro Nakamura (Development and Main Maintainer), and Yoshihiko Nankaku.

It was originally only in Japanese and English, but Mandarin was later added; the website only supports English and Japanese despite this currently.

In 2016, Sinsy stated using the deep learning processing technology DNN.

Products

Yoko (謡子), Japanese female vocal. She currently has two vocals for the service, both in Japanese, one being a beta and the other a fully released version.
Xiang-Ling (香鈴), Japanese female vocal. An English vocal was added Christmas, 2015. Mandarin was added also to her language capabilities.
Matsuo-P (松尾P), English masculine vocal
Namine Ritsu S (波音リツＳ), a Japanese male vocal currently in beta. Originally produced for UTAU, it released on December 25, 2013.
Unidentified; an unknown vocal in Japanese
Unidentified; a second unknown vocal in Japanese

References

Speech synthesis software
Singing software synthesizers